John Modinos (May 26, 1927 – January 11, 2011) was a Cypriot opera baritone.

Life and career 
In 1927, John Modinos was born in Omodos, a small village in the Troodos Mountains. He had a career that spanned over four decades. His illustrious career in music started in New York after winning "The American Theater Wing Concert Award" with which he made his Recital debut in New York' s Town Hall that had tremendous reviews. His operatic debut was also in New York in Traviata with  Beverly Sills. Another singing Award "The American Opera Auditions" brought him to Europe, performing Figaro in Barber of Seville in Milano with sensational notices and Scarpia in Tosca in Florence, Italy with James King as Cavaradosi. The same summer, he performed at the Athens Festival with Teresa Stratas, the world Premiere of the Opera "Nausicaa". Both these events opened the way for world acclamation.

With Luciano Pavarotti he had sung many times "Rigoletto" a role that secured for Modenos worldwide fame for his interpretation and above all his brilliant singing. Accordingly, he has performed the role 223 times all over the world.

 with Plácido Domingo       Traviata, Andrea Chenier etc.
 with Montserrat Caballe       Un ballo in maschera, Der Rosenkavalier
 with Magda Olivero            Adriana Lecouvreur
 with Cesare Siepi              Faust, Don Carlos etc.
 with James Mc Cracken     Aida, Trovatore, Otello.
 with Vladimir Atlantov        Pagliacci
 with Martina Arroyo           Aida, Trovatore
 with Ghena Dimitrova        Nabucco

and of course with numerous other top singers and conductors, Aragal, Jess Thomas, Schwarzkopf, Seefeld, Troyanos, Moscona, Talvera, Gremdl, Edelman, Nikolaidi, Della Casa, Hilde Gueden, Zylis - Gara, Regine Crespin, Jenny Drivala etc.

Modinos died on January 11, 2011, in Athens, Greece. The cause of death was heart failure.

References

1927 births
2011 deaths
20th-century Cypriot male singers
Operatic baritones